PSG & Sons’ Charities is a charity organization dedicated to education, healthcare and community service. It is based out of Coimbatore, India.

History
PSG & Sons’ Charities was established in 1926 with the purpose of augmenting the Sarvajana school which was started when a family member was denied admission in British run school. Four brothers PSG Venkataswamy Naidu, PSG Rangaswamy Naidu, PSG Ganga Naidu and PSG Narayanaswamy Naidu voluntarily divided their ancestral properties into five parts, reserving the one fifth amounting to  2.01 lakhs to create the charity trust.

Institutions
The institutions run by the charity include:
PSG Sarvajana High School
PSG Industrial Institute
PSG Polytechnic College
PSG Middle School
PSG Primary School
PSG College of Arts and Science
PSG College of Technology
PSG Rural Health Center
PSG Metallurgy and Foundry Division
PSG Institute of Medical Sciences & Research
PSG Industrial Training Center
PSG Hospitals
PSG Centre for Sponsored Research and Consultancy
PSG Centre for Non-formal & Continuing Education
PSG Textile Research and Training Center
PSG Urban Health Center
PSG Institute of Management
PSG College of Nursing
PSG Science and Technology Industrial Park
PSG TIFAC Core
PSG College of Physiotherapy
PSG College of Pharmacy
PSG CULES
PSG Center for Advertising & Communication
PSG Children's School
PSG Offshore Health Management Services
PSG High School
PSG Institute of Advanced Studies
PSG Public Schools
PSG Institute of Technology and Applied Research

References

Educational organisations based in India
Environmental organisations based in India
Organisations based in Coimbatore
1926 establishments in India
Organizations established in 1926